The 2016 Wrocław Open was a professional tennis tournament played on indoor hard courts. It was the second edition of the tournament which was part of the 2016 ATP Challenger Tour. It took place in Wrocław, Poland between 15 and 21 February 2016.

Singles main-draw entrants

Seeds

 1 Rankings as of February 8, 2016.

Other entrants
The following players received wildcards into the singles main draw:
  Paweł Ciaś
  Hubert Hurkacz
  Łukasz Kubot
  Kamil Majchrzak

The following player received entry to the singles main draw as an alternate:
  Marco Chiudinelli

The following player received entry to the singles main draw as a special exemption:
  Grégoire Barrère

The following player received entry to the singles main draw as a protected ranking:
  Albano Olivetti

The following players received entry from the qualifying draw:
  Jan Hernych 
  Zdeněk Kolář
  Denys Molchanov 
  Marko Tepavac

Champions

Singles

 Marco Chiudinelli def.  Jan Hernych 6–3, 7–6(11–9)

Doubles

 Pierre-Hugues Herbert /  Albano Olivetti def.  Nikola Mektić /  Antonio Šančić 6–3, 7–6(7–4)

External links
 Official Website

Wroclaw Open
Wrocław Open
Wroc